Tin King is one of the 37 constituencies in the Tuen Mun District. The constituency returns one district councillor to the Tuen Mun District Council, with an election every four years.

Tin King constituency is loosely based on the area of Tin King Estate in Tuen Mun with estimated population of 16,443.

Councillors represented

Election results

2010s

2000s

1990s

References

Tuen Mun
Constituencies of Hong Kong
Constituencies of Tuen Mun District Council
1991 establishments in Hong Kong
Constituencies established in 1991